Jeanne Balibar (born 13 April 1968) is a French actress and singer.

Life and career 

Balibar was born in Paris, the daughter of Marxist philosopher Étienne Balibar and physicist Françoise Balibar.
She started her career as a student in the famous French theater school "Cours Florent", in Paris, with her friends, actor Eric Ruf and photographer & actor Gregory Herpe.
She began her acting career on the stage, in "Don Juan" at the Festival d'Avignon. Her first film role was in Arnaud Desplechin's 1992 film The Sentinel. She continues to perform in both spheres. She has supported François Hollande's 2012 presidential campaign.

She starred in Ne change rien (2009) directed by Pedro Costa. Among other films, she appeared in 17 Times Cécile Cassard (2002), directed by Christophe Honoré, with Béatrice Dalle and Romain Duris; All the Fine Promises (2003), directed by Jean-Paul Civeyrac, with Bulle Ogier and Valérie Crunchant; and Clean (2004), directed by Olivier Assayas, with Maggie Cheung and Nick Nolte.

Filmography                   
{| class="wikitable sortable"
|-
! Year
! Title
! Original title
! Character
|-
| align="center"| 1996
| My Sex Life... or How I Got into an Argument
| Comment je me suis disputé... (ma vie sexuelle)
| align="center"| Valérie
|-
| align="center"| 1998
| Late August, Early September| Fin août, début septembre| align="center"| Jenny
|-
| align="center"| 2000
| Comedy of Innocence| Comédie de l'innocence| align="center"| Isabella
|-
| align="center"| 2000
| Tomorrow's Another Day| Ça ira mieux demain| align="center"| Elisabeth
|-
| align="center"| 2001
—————
2001
| Who knows?———————-
Le stade de Wimbledon 
| Va savoir——————
| align="center"| Camille
|-
| align="center"| 2002
| A Private Affair| Une affaire privée| align="center"| Sylvie
|-
| align="center"| 2002
| Seventeen Times Cecile Cassard| 17 fois Cécile Cassard| align="center"| Edith
|-
| align="center"| 2003
| Code 46| 
| align="center"| Sylvie
|-
| align="center"| 2004
| Clean| 
| align="center"| Irene Paolini
|-
| align="center"| 2007
| The Duchess of Langeais| Ne touchez pas la hache| align="center"| Antoinette
|-
| align="center"| 2008
| Sagan| 
| align="center"| Peggy Roche
|-
| align="center"| 2009
| All About Actresses| Le Bal des actrices| align="center"| Herself
|-
| align="center"| 2009
| A Town Called Panic| Panique au village| align="center"| Jacqueline Longrée
|-
| align="center"| 2014
| Grace of Monaco| 
| align="center"| Countess of Baciocchi
|-
| align="center"| 2014
| Portrait of the Artist|  Le Dos rouge| align="center"| Célia Bhy
|-
| align="center"| 2016
| Never Ever 
| À jamais| align="center"| Isabelle
|-
| align="center"| 2017
| Barbara| 
| align="center"| Brigitte
|-
| align="center"| 2018
| Cold War| Zimna wojna| align="center"| Juliette
|-
| align="center"| 2019
| Les Misérables| 
| align="center"| The Commissioner
|-
| align="center"| 2021
| Lost Illusions| Illusions perdues| align="center"| Marquise d'Espard
|-
| align="center"| 2021
| Memoria| məmorᴉa| align="center"| Agnes Cerkinsky
|-
| align="center"| 2021
| The Rope (Miniseries)
| La Corde| align="center"| Sophie Rauk
|-
| align="center"| 2022
| Irma Vep (Miniseries)
| 
| align="center"| Zoe
|-
|
|Franklin (miniseries)|
| align="center"| Anne-Catherine de Ligniville, Madame Helvétius
|}

 Discography 
 Paramour (2003)
 Slalom Dame'' (2006)

Decorations 
 Officer of the Order of Arts and Letters (2016)
 2017: Lumières Award for Best Actress
 2017: César Award for Best Actress

References

External links 

 
 
 
 Actrisesdefrance.org – web site in French with images

1968 births
Living people
École Normale Supérieure alumni
French stage actresses
French women singers
Actresses from Paris
Troupe of the Comédie-Française
French film actresses
French television actresses
French National Academy of Dramatic Arts alumni
Cours Florent alumni
Best Actress César Award winners
Best Actress Lumières Award winners
Officiers of the Ordre des Arts et des Lettres
20th-century French actresses
21st-century French actresses